Tunku Ampuan Najihah binti Almarhum Tunku Besar Burhanuddin (Jawi: تونكو امڤوان ناجحة بنت المرحوم تونكو بسر برهان الدين; born 1 September 1923) is the Tunku Ampuan of Negeri Sembilan. She was formerly the Tunku Ampuan Besar or Queen of Negeri Sembilan from 1967 to 2008. She also served as Raja Permaisuri Agong of Malaysia between 1994 and 1999.

Tuanku Najihah was married to the former Yang di-Pertuan Besar Negeri Sembilan Tuanku Jaafar ibni Almarhum Tuanku Abdul Rahman. Tuanku Jaafar is also the stepson of Tuanku Najihah's sister, Tunku Kurshiah binti Almarhum Tunku Besar Burhanuddin, who also served as Tunku Ampuan Besar. Tuanku Najihah succeeded her sister, Tunku Durah, as Tunku Ampuan Besar in 1967.

Early life
Daughter of Tunku Besar Burhanuddin ibni Almarhum Tuanku Antah (sometime Regent of Negeri Sembilan) and born on 1 September 1923, Tuanku Najihah received her formal education at the Tuanku Muhammad School in Kuala Pilah, Negeri Sembilan. She graduated from the London School of Oriental Studies. She also attended the special language and training course provided for the wives of diplomats while Tuanku Ja’afar was pursuing a course in diplomatic services in London.

Social contributions
Tuanku Najihah was made a committee member of the Associated Country Women of the World. She is the patron of various women's organizations such as the Girl Guides of Negeri Sembilan, the Islamic Women's Welfare Council and the Women's Institute. She is the president of the Tuanku Ampuan Badminton Team, the Patron of the Malaysian Women's Hockey Team, Malaysian Women's Football Team, Malaysian Women's Golf Team and the Malaysian Women's Golf Association (MALGA). He also served as first Chancellor of Universiti Sains Islam Malaysia.

Family life
The royal couple had three sons and three daughters :

 Tunku Tan Sri Naquiah, Tunku Dara (born 26 December 1944, photo)
 Tunku Dato' Seri Utama Naquiyuddin, Tunku Laksamana (born 8 March 1947, photo)
 Tunku Tan Sri Dato' Seri Imran, Tunku Muda of Serting (born 21 March 1949, photo)
 Tunku Puan Sri Jawahir, Tunku Putri (born 27 January 1952, photo)
 Tunku Dato' Seri Irinah (born 23 November 1957, photo)
 Tunku Dato' Seri Nazaruddin, Tunku Panglima Besar (born 26 October 1959, photo)

Awards and recognitions 

She was awarded :

Honours of Negeri Sembilan 
  Member of the Royal Family Order of Negeri Sembilan (DKNS) 
  Knight Grand Commander or Dato’ Sri Paduka of the Grand Order of Tuanku Ja’afar (SPTJ)

Honours of Malaysia 
 , as Raja Permaisuri Agong of Malaysia (26 April 1994 to 25 April 1999), she has been awarded : 
  Recipient of the Order of the Crown of the Realm (DMN) 
  : 
  Member of the Royal Family Order of Kedah (DK) 
  : 
  Recipient of the Royal Family Order of Kelantan or Star of Yunus (DK)
  Knight Grand Commander of the Order of the Crown of Kelantan or Star of Muhammad (SPMK, 11.11.1992)

Foreign honours 
  : 
  Dame Grand Cross of the Order of Civil Merit (24.3.1995)

Places named after her 
Several places were named after her, including:
 Tuanku Ampuan Najihah Hospital in Kuala Pilah, Negeri Sembilan
 Kompleks Sukan Tunku Najihah, Universiti Sains Islam Malaysia, Nilai, Negeri Sembilan
 SMK Tunku Ampuan Najihah, a secondary school in Seremban, Negeri Sembilan
 Taman Sinar Harapan Tuanku Ampuan Najihah in Seremban, Negeri Sembilan
 Taman Tuanku Ampuan Najihah, a residential area in Seremban, Negeri Sembilan

See also
Yang Di-Pertuan Agong
Raja Permaisuri Agong

References
 "Syarikat Pesaka Antah Sdn Bhd" Website, presentation of the Board of Directors with photo of Tuanku Najihah

1923 births
Living people
People from Negeri Sembilan
Royal House of Negeri Sembilan
Malaysian Muslims
Malaysian people of Minangkabau descent
Negeri Sembilan royal consorts
Malaysian royal consorts
Members of the Royal Family Order of Kedah
Grand Cross of the Order of Civil Merit
Malaysian queens consort
Recipients of the Order of the Crown of the Realm